Gabriel Schacht, (born 8 May 1981) is a Brazilian former professional footballer who as a midfielder.

Career 
Schacht joined Aboomoslem in 2010.

Career statistics

Notes

References 

1981 births
Living people
Brazilian footballers
Association football midfielders
F.C. Aboomoslem players
Marília Atlético Clube players
Al-Sailiya SC players
Grêmio Esportivo Brasil players
Botafogo Futebol Clube (SP) players
Sport Club Internacional players
Associação Atlética Ponte Preta players
Mogi Mirim Esporte Clube players
Sociedade Esportiva e Recreativa Caxias do Sul players
Brazilian expatriate footballers
Brazilian expatriate sportspeople in Iran
Expatriate footballers in Iran